Several Canadian naval units have been named HMCS Quinte;

 , a  that entered service in 1941 and was discarded in 1947.
 , a  that entered service in 1954 and was discarded in 1965.

Battle honours
Atlantic, 1941-42.

References

 Government of Canada Ships' Histories - HMCS Quinte

Royal Canadian Navy ship names